The Kazakhstan Basketball Cup is the national men's professional basketball cup competition in the country of Kazakhstan. It is organised annually over a few days in a single location by the National Basketball Federation Kazakhstan. Its official designation in full is: Basketball Cup of the Republic of Kazakhstan for men's teams ).

Titles 

 2003 Otrar Almaty
 2004 Astana Tigers
 2005 Tobol Kostanay
 2006 Astana Tigers
 2007 Saba Battery
 2008 Astana Tigers 
 2009 Barsy Atyrau 
 2010 Astana Tigers
 2011 BC Astana 
 2012 BC Astana 
 2013 BC Astana 
 2014 BC Astana 
 2015 Almatynski Legion 
 2016 Almatynski Legion 
 2017 BC Astana
 2018 BC Astana 
 2019 BC Astana
 2020 BC Astana
 2021 BC Astana
 2022 Barsy Atyrau

Results
The title has been alternatively decided by round-robin or by a single final (see Format and rules).

Format and rules
The cup has been alternatively played in two different formats.
A round-robin format, where each team plays the others in the tournament once, with the team in possession of the best record (most points or head-to-head record) declared the winner.

A finals format, the teams are separated in two groups (usually of three teams), where all teams in a group play each other. The last placed teams in each group then play for 5th place whilst the respective first and second place teams compete in the semifinals, with the winners moving on to the final, all single games.

The cup traditionally used to open the season, however from the 2012 edition it was switched nearer to the end of the season (February–March), leading to a strange situation wherein BC Astana won the cup twice in 2011–12.

In the 2015 edition, teams were only allowed to field Kazakhstani players, with foreign players barred.

From 2022, the cup returned to a round-robin format.

History
The 2013 Cup was held on March 19–24 in Almaty between five teams. BC Astana won all four of their games to win the title.

The 2014 Cup was contested between six clubs in Astana in March, BC Astana won the cup again, beating Kapshagay 88–76 in the final.

The 2015 Cup was played from 18 to 22 February in Almaty, six teams participated, though holders BC Astana did not defend their title as they were already playing three matches (two on the road) in other competitions around that period.
Almatynski Legion and Tobol Kostanay met in the final, with Almatynski Legion winning the title after a 90–86 victory.

All-Cup Team
The league selects their choice of the best players at each position, forming the tournament team for each edition.

See also
Kazakhstan Basketball Championship

References

External links
National Basketball Federation Kazakhstan page 

 
Cup
Basketball cup competitions in Asia
Basketball cup competitions in Europe